Benjamin Longue (born 3 December 1980 in Nouméa, New Caledonia) is a former professional footballer who played as a defender. He played for AS Magenta in the New Caledonia Division Honneur before retiring in 2013. At international level, he represented the New Caledonia national team.

References

1980 births
Living people
Association football defenders
New Caledonian footballers
New Caledonia international footballers
SC Bastia players
CA Bastia players
AS Magenta players
Ligue 1 players
2008 OFC Nations Cup players